Culpina is a small town in Bolivia. In 2010 it had an estimated population of 2,747.

References

External links
 www.ine.gob.bo Culpina Municipality: population data and map

Populated places in Chuquisaca Department